The Sturt Gorge Recreation Park is a protected area in the Australian state of South Australia located in the suburbs of Bellevue Heights, Craigburn Farm and Flagstaff Hill within the Adelaide metropolitan area about  south of the Adelaide central business district.

The park was established in 1973. and protects an area  recognised as an area of great geological significance. It channels the Sturt River down to the Adelaide Plains.  

The Sturt Tillite formation was the first area in the world to provide definite evidence of Cryogenian glaciation (the Snowball Earth). It is hypothesised that the landform was created from glacial material that dropped from ice floating in the ocean which covered the area 800 million years ago.

Fires of any kind are prohibited in the park.

It is classified as an IUCN Category III protected area. In 1980, the recreation park was listed on the former Register of the National Estate.

See also

 List of protected areas in Adelaide
 List of canyons

References

External links
Sturt Gorge Recreation Park webpage on the Protected Planet website

Recreation Parks of South Australia
Protected areas in Adelaide
1973 establishments in Australia
Protected areas established in 1973
South Australian places listed on the defunct Register of the National Estate
Canyons and gorges of Australia